Pronay Halder (born 25 February 1993), is an Indian footballer who plays as a defensive midfielder for Indian Super League club Jamshedpur and the India national team

Club career
Born in Barrackpore, West Bengal, Halder started his youth career with Tata Football Academy in 2007 and got graduated in 2010.

Pailan Arrows
Halder signed for Pailan Arrows in the I-League for the 2011-12 season in the summer of 2011. He then played in Pailan's second victory of the season in a Round 23 match against HAL.

Dempo
On 26 October 2013, Halder signed for Dempo with three other players Alwyn George, Holicharan Narzary and Narayan Das. He made his debut for Dempo in the I-League on 1 November 2013 against Mohun Bagan at the Duler Stadium and played the whole match as Dempo drew the match 0–0.

FC Goa (loan)
Halder represented FC Goa during the 2014 Indian Super League but did not feature in any game, due to an injury, which kept him out of most of the 2014-15 I-League season. Halder was signed up by FC Goa again on loan from Dempo for the 2015 ISL.

Mohun Bagan
On 30 December 2015, Halder signed two-year contract with Mohun Bagan. Coach Sanjoy Sen said in a press conference later in the week that Halder was an "inspirational young talent".

2015-16 season
On 16 January 2016, Halder made his debut for Mohun Bagan against Salgaocar which Bagan won 4–2. Halder has made a total of 10 appearances in I-League season and was awarded Man of the Match twice. He was the first choice defensive midfielder in Bagan but due to knee injury it kept him sidelined for 2 weeks. On 24 February 2016, Halder started for Bagan in AFC Cup against Maldives club Maziya S&RC.

2016-2017 season
On 8 January 2017, Halder played against Churchill Brothers in first game of the season. He has also played in AFC Cup for Bagan in most of the group stage matches.

Mumbai City (loan)
Halder signed for Mumbai City for 2016 ISL season.

FC Goa
On 23 July 2017, Halder got picked by Goa in ISL Draft for 2017–18 season.

ATK
In June 2018, ATK has signed Halder on a two-year deal. He became the number one choice for coach Steve Coppell in midfield.

Jamshedpur
In September 2021, Jamshedpur loaned in Pronay for the upcoming season. He returned to the city where he made his start as a football player with Tata Football Academy.

He made his debut for the club against East Bengal, on 21 November, in a 1–1 stalemate. On 15 March, he scored his only goal of the season in the playoffs semi-final second leg, against Kerala Blasters in a 1–1 (1–2 agg) draw.

International

Youth
Halder played for India U19, and was involved in three matches and scored against Uzbekistan U19.

He was the part of India U23 for 2013 AFC U-22 Asian Cup qualification which was held in Oman from 23 June 2012. Halder played 4 matches during the tournament.

Senior
Halder became the 496th player to earn a senior cap for India on 31 August 2015 against Nepal in an International friendly. Halder scored a stunning long ranger on his debut for India against Chinese Taipei in Intercontinental Cup in Mumbai.

Career statistics

Club

International

Scores and results list India's goal tally first.

Honours

India
 SAFF Championship: 2015
 Intercontinental Cup: 2018
 King's Cup third place: 2019

Jamshedpur
Indian Super League Premiers: 2021–22

References

External links
 Goal Profile
 I-League Profile

1993 births
Living people
Indian footballers
Footballers from Kolkata
I-League players
Indian Arrows players
Dempo SC players
India youth international footballers
Footballers at the 2014 Asian Games
India international footballers
Association football midfielders
2019 AFC Asian Cup players
Asian Games competitors for India
FC Goa players
Mohun Bagan AC players
Indian Super League players
ATK (football club) players
ATK Mohun Bagan FC players
Jamshedpur FC players